Legend is the debut EP by black metal band Abigail Williams. It was released in October 2006 through Candlelight Records. The EP is noted for its metalcore influences that are abandoned after this release.

Musical critic website AllMusic stated "Legend is best described as death metal/black metal with metalcore influences."

Track listing 

"Like Carrion Birds" and "The Conqueror Wyrm" were originally demo tracks that were titled "Swollen Disgust" and "Melquiades (The Great Work)" respectively.
A re-recorded version of "Watchtower" was released as a digital single in 2009.
iTunes has mistakenly titled "Watchtower" as "Procession of the Aeons", "Procession of the Aeons" as "The Conqueror Wyrm", and "The Conqeror Wyrm" as "Watchtower".

Personnel 
Abigail Williams,
Ken Sorceron – vocals, guitar
Bjorn Dannov – guitar
Brad Riffs – guitar
Zach Gibson – drums
Kyle Dickinson – bass guitar
Ashley "Ellyllon" Jurgemeyer – piano, orchestra, keyboards (tracks 4 & 5)

Production
Michael Beck – engineering

References 

2006 debut EPs
2006 live albums
Abigail Williams (band) albums
Candlelight Records albums